Calystegia collina is a species of morning glory known by the common name Coast Range false bindweed. It is endemic to the Coast Ranges of northern and central California, where it grows on slopes and in woodlands, often on serpentine soils.

Description
Calystegia collina is a rhizomatous perennial herb with densely hairy stems and foliage. The stem lies flat and generally does not climb as many other morning glories do. It reaches a maximum length of about 30 centimeters. The small leaves are kidney-shaped or deeply lobed and are wavy or crinkly along the edges.

The inflorescence holds a single white flower 2 to 5 centimeters wide when fully open.

External links
Jepson Manual Treatment: Calystegia collina
Calystegia collina Photo gallery

collina
Endemic flora of California
Natural history of the California chaparral and woodlands
Natural history of the California Coast Ranges
Plants described in 1898
Flora without expected TNC conservation status